The 2007–08 Combined Counties Football League season was the 30th in the history of the Combined Counties Football League, a football competition in England.

Premier Division

The Premier Division featured one new team in a league of 22 teams after the promotion of Chipstead to the Isthmian League:
 Horley Town, promoted from Division One

League table

Division One

Division One featured two new teams in a league of 20 teams: 
Knaphill, joined from the Surrey County Intermediate League (Western)
Neasden Foundation

Also, Coulsdon Town and Salfords merged to form Coulsdon United.

League table

References

 League tables

External links
 Combined Counties League Official Site

2007-08
9